Amira Ben Amor (born 7 September 1985, in Nabeul) is a Tunisian long-distance runner. She competed in the marathon at the 2012 Summer Olympics, placing 80th with a time of 2:40:13, which set the Tunisian national record.

References

1985 births
Living people
People from Nabeul
Tunisian female long-distance runners
Tunisian female marathon runners
Olympic athletes of Tunisia
Athletes (track and field) at the 2012 Summer Olympics
21st-century Tunisian women